Stephen Keyes Williams (May 9, 1819 Bennington, Bennington County, Vermont – March 29, 1916 Newark, Wayne County, New York) was an American lawyer and politician from New York.

Life
He was the son of Richard Parks Williams MD (1784–1850) and Lucy (Fletcher) Williams (1792–1886). In 1823, the family removed to Wayne County, New York. He graduated from Union College in 1837. Then he studied law, was admitted to the bar in 1842, and practiced. On November 26, 1846, he married Angelina Crane (1826–1910), and they had six children.

He was District Attorney of Wayne County from 1851 to 1853; and a member of the New York State Senate (25th D.) from 1864 to 1869, sitting in the 87th, 88th, 89th, 90th, 91st and 92nd New York State Legislatures. He was a delegate to the 1864 National Union National Convention in Baltimore.

He edited 174 volumes of reports of the U.S. Supreme Court.

Sources
 The New York Civil List compiled by Franklin Benjamin Hough, Stephen C. Hutchins and Edgar Albert Werner (1870; pg. 443f and 544)
 Life Sketches of the State Officers, Senators, and Members of the Assembly of the State of New York, in 1867 by S. R. Harlow & H. H. Boone (pg. 67ff)
 Williams genealogy at Bogausch.com
 Stephen K. Williams Dies at 97 in NYT on March 30, 1916

1819 births
1916 deaths
Republican Party New York (state) state senators
People from Newark, New York
Wayne County District Attorneys
People from Bennington, Vermont
Union College (New York) alumni
19th-century American politicians